Michael Hugh Gunton Mayes (born 31 August 1941) was Bishop of Kilmore, Elphin and Ardagh from  1993 to 2000 and then of Limerick and Killaloe until 2008.

Mayes was educated at The Royal School, Armagh and Trinity College, Dublin. He was ordained in 1964 and his first post was as a curate in  Portadown after which he spent six years as an USPG missionary in Japan.
 He then held incumbencies in Cork and was later Archdeacon of the area before his ordination to the episcopate.

References

1941 births
Place of birth missing (living people)
People educated at The Royal School, Armagh
Alumni of Trinity College Dublin
Irish Anglicans
Archdeacons of Cork, Cloyne and Ross
20th-century Anglican bishops in Ireland
21st-century Anglican bishops in Ireland
Bishops of Kilmore, Elphin and Ardagh
Bishops of Limerick and Killaloe
Living people